The 1945 season was the 15th completed season of Finnish Football League Championship, which was played in two groups followed by a knock-out phase.

Championship play-off

Semi-finals
HPS Helsinki 5–2 HJK Helsinki     
TPS Turku 4–5 VPS Vaasa

Final
VPS Vaasa 2–0 HPS Helsinki

References
Finland - List of final tables (RSSSF)

Mestaruussarja seasons
Fin
Fin
Mestaruussarja